= Terrence Malick bibliography =

The following is a list of books and essays about Terrence Malick.

- Hintermann, Carlo; Villa, Daniele; Baracaroli, Luciano; Panichi, Gerardo (15 March 2016). Terrence Malick: Rehearsing the Unexpected. Faber & Faber. ISBN 978-0-571-23456-1.
- Leithart, Peter J. (6 August 2013). Shining Glory: Theological Reflections on Terrence Malicks Tree of Life. Cascade Books. ISBN 978-1-62032-413-4.
- Maher, Paul Jr. (2014). One Big Soul: An Oral History of Terrence Malick. Upstart Crow Publishing. ISBN 978-1-3045-9527-0.
- Michaels, Lloyd (2009). Terrence Malick. University of Illinois Press. ISBN 978-0-252-07575-9.
- Morrison, James (1 January 2003). The Films of Terrence Malick. Greenwood Publishing Group. ISBN 978-0-275-97247-9.
- Patterson, Hannah (2007). The Cinema of Terrence Malick: Poetic Visions of America. Columbia University Press. ISBN 978-1-905674-25-1.
- Rybin, Steven (2012). Terrence Malick and the Thought of Film. Rowman & Littlefield. ISBN 978-0-7391-6675-8.
- Tucker, Thomas Deane; Kendall, Stuart (12 May 2011). Terrence Malick: Film and Philosophy. Continuum. ISBN 978-1-4411-5003-5.
